Tullow (formerly Tulach Ó bhFéidhlim/ Tullowphelim) is a market town in County Carlow, Ireland. It is located on the River Slaney where the N81 road intersects with the R725. , the population was 4,673.

History
There is a statue of Father John Murphy, one of the leaders of the 1798 Rebellion, who was captured near Tullow and executed in the Market Square on 2 July. There is a small museum with information about this period and other local history.

Sport

Gaelic Sports
Saint Patrick's are the GAA club in Tullow who currently compete in the Carlow Junior A Football Championship and have been crowned champions on ten occasions. They also compete in the Carlow Intermediate Hurling Championship.

Soccer
Parkville United who play at Hawkins Lane Tullow compete in the Carlow premier division and Slaney Rovers who play at Tullow town pitch.

Rugby
Tullow RFC are the local rugby team. Former Ireland international player Seán O'Brien played with the club.

Darts
Emerald Darts are a Darts Academy situated at Floor 1 Post Office Sorting Office (At The Back Of Supervalu) who are the ONLY Darts Academy in Ireland who compete against other Darts Academies worldwide in the Junior Darts Corporation (JDC) grading system affiliated to The Professional Darts Corporation (PDC) and various national tournaments, Kian Cullen represented Emerald Darts in the JDC European Championships in the UK in December 2016.
Emerald Darts are proudly sponsored by Unicorn Darts the biggest dart manufacturer in the world.

Literature
There is quote in Brendan Behan's Borstal Boy that mentions Tullow: "Littlewood was twenty and married. We thought he was as old as the Hills of Tullow."

Transport

Railway
The town was at one time connected to the Irish railway network, on a branch line from Naas in County Kildare. Tullow railway station opened on 1 June 1886, closed for passenger and goods traffic in 1947 and finally closed on 1 April 1959.

Bus
Bus Éireann route 132 provides a once a day each way (Mondays to Fridays inclusive) commuter link to Dublin via Tallaght. There are also a limited range (usually one/two journeys a day each way) of Bus Éireann Expressway services linking the town to Dublin, New Ross, Waterford and Rosslare Europort. JJ Kavanagh and Sons route from Hacketstown to Carlow also serves the town. The main stopping place for buses is on the Square.

Weather
A local weather station operates in Tullow, which records all local weather and provides a five-day local forecast. Tullow recorded the lowest temperature in 2010 at −17.7 °C. It is also based in a basin so the weather patterns are slightly different.

Business
Tullow Oil is one of Europe's largest independent exploration and production companies with worldwide operations.

Notable people
 Denis Donoghue, literary critic, was born in Tullow.
 Daniel Delany, Bishop of Kildare and Leighlin, founded the Brigidine Sisters in 1807 and the Patrician Brothers in 1808.
 Seán O'Brien, professional rugby union player for Leinster and Ireland is from Ardristan, Tullow and played for local teams - Tullow CS and Tullow RFC
 Herbie Brennan, author of the young adult Faerie Wars series, lives in Tullow.
 Christabel Bielenberg, author of The Past is Myself, lived in Tullow.
 Tony Lalik, was in smyths adds and also won the county Carlow spelling Bee in 2020

See also
 List of abbeys and priories in Ireland (County Carlow)
 List of towns and villages in Ireland
 Market Houses in Ireland

References

External links

Tullow town
Disused stations

Towns and villages in County Carlow